Amanda Coetzer was the defending champion, but did not compete this year.

Barbara Rittner won the title by defeating Klára Koukalová 6–3, 6–2 in the final.

Seeds

Draw

Finals

Top half

Bottom half

References

External links
 Official results archive (ITF)
 Official results archive (WTA)

Belgian Open (tennis)
TennisCup Vlaanderen